The Taliban Five were five Afghan detainees at Guantanamo Bay and former high-ranking members of the Taliban government of Afghanistan who, after being held since 2002, indefinitely without charges, were exchanged in 2014 for United States Army sergeant Bowe Bergdahl.

For several years there were rumors that the Obama Presidency's negotiations with the Taliban hinged over the release of these men. The Taliban wanted the men to be sent to Qatar. The United States was reported to be considering freeing them if the Taliban would release Bowe Bergdahl, a soldier the Taliban had been holding since 2009. The Taliban Five were released to custody in Doha, Qatar on June 1, 2014. Bergdahl, upon his release, was tried by general court-martial on charges of desertion, pleaded guilty, and was sentenced to be dishonorably discharged.

The Taliban Five have been described as "the hardest of the hard-core" by John McCain and James Franklin Jeffrey. All five are deemed "high" risk to the United States and were recommended for "continued detention". This reverses a position McCain held only four months earlier. McCain said his stance has changed only because the previous proposal was to release five "hard-core" Taliban leaders as a "confidence-building measure." The current proposal would be an actual exchange of prisoners. "I would be inclined to support such a thing, depending on a lot of details," he said. The Wall Street Journal described the identity of the five men as an "open secret", since members of Congress had been briefed on the negotiations.

The Taliban Five were involved in peace talks to end the conflict in Afghanistan with the U.S. in March 2019.

Members of the Taliban Five
The Taliban Five were listed as very dangerous men by the United States.

Taliban Five prisoner exchange
Over the years, there were several premature reports of some or all of the men being transferred. On January 10, 2012, Iranian news sources asserted three of the five men had been transferred, in return for Bergdahl. On July 29, 2013, Ynetnews reported that the USA had already released the five men as a goodwill gesture without insisting on the Taliban in turn releasing Bergdahl.

On May 31, 2014, following negotiations coordinated by the government of Qatar, the five detainees were exchanged for Bergdahl, who was thought to be the last remaining American prisoner of war. The Taliban five were taken from Guantanamo Bay and flown by a C-17 Globemaster III to Qatar, where they were required to remain for a year as a condition of their release. They arrived in Qatar on June 1, 2014. A portion of an edited video of Bergdahl's handover released by the Taliban on June 4, 2014, shows the homecoming of the prisoners in an unknown location in Qatar where a caravan of SUVs pulls over alongside a busy stretch of road with the former prisoners exiting and hugging their supporters. The video portion was mixed with joyful Jihadi song. In late-May 2015, the travel ban was extended while negotiations continue between Qatar and the United States.

Internal debate over Taliban Five prisoner release
According to Time, Pentagon officials and the intelligence community had successfully fought off releasing the Taliban Five in the past; President Barack Obama's move to release the prisoners was described as a "victory" for those at the White House and the State Department who had argued against the military.

In January 2015, several commentators repeated assertions that US officials who insisted on anonymity had said that one of the five men had tried to contact the Haqqani faction, from Qatar.  
These commentators, citing this anonymous report, asserted that at least one of the five men was a "recidivist".
On February 2, 2014, the Oman Tribune quoted Khalid bin Mohammad Al Attiyah Qatar's Foreign Minister denials of these reports.

Attiya assured the public that Omani and US officials were cooperating in monitoring that the men were complying with the terms of the agreement that allowed them to travel to Qatar, and there had been no sign that any of the men had taken any steps that would violate that agreement.

References

2014 in American politics
2014 controversies in the United States
Afghan extrajudicial prisoners of the United States
Afghanistan–United States relations
Obama administration controversies